is a 2011 Japanese animated film in the Hayate the Combat Butler anime and manga franchise. The film was released in theaters on August 27, 2011, as a double-bill with Mahou Sensei Negima! Anime Final.  The film was licensed for streaming and home video release by Sentai Filmworks in August 2015.

Plot

Hayate, Nagi, and the gang spend the last days of summer break at Nishizawa's countryside vacation home. But a mysterious spirit (Suzune Ayasaki—Hayate's grandmother) has concocted a scheme to separate the butler from his young mistress in a closed-space amusement park that Hayate used to visit when he was young.

References

External links
  
 

2011 anime films
Anime films based on manga
Hayate the Combat Butler
Japanese animated films
NBCUniversal Entertainment Japan
Sentai Filmworks

ja:ハヤテのごとく! (アニメ)#劇場アニメ